This is a list of notable events in music that took place in the year 1952.

Specific locations
1952 in British music
1952 in Norwegian music

Specific genres
1952 in country music
1952 in jazz

Events
February 26 – Popular American singer Jo Stafford marries bandleader/arranger Paul Weston.
March 1 – Sun Records records its first release in Memphis, Tennessee.
March 21 – First major rock and roll concert, Alan Freed's Moondog Coronation Ball in Cleveland, Ohio.
August 29 – David Tudor gives the premiere of John Cage's 4′33″, during which the performer does not play, in Woodstock, New York.
September – Bill Haley and His Saddlemen change their image to become Bill Haley & His Comets.
October 7 – First edition of Bob Horn's Bandstand is broadcast as a local show from station WFIL-TV in Philadelphia, Pennsylvania. It is later renamed American Bandstand and syndicated.
November 14 – First UK Singles Chart published by the New Musical Express, with Al Martino's "Here in My Heart" as number one.
date unknown
Jazz singer Ernesto Bonino moves from Italy to the United States.
Accordionist John Serry Sr. first performs in Broadway theatre with Shirley Booth in The Time of the Cuckoo.
Finnish composer Aarre Merikanto wins the Olympic hymn competition.

Publications
Pierre Schaeffer – A la recherche d'une musique concrète (The Search for a Concrete Music), an explanation of his experimental approach to composing.
John Serry Sr. – The Syncopated Accordionist.

Musical groups formed
76th Army Band
338th Army Band (reactivated)
The Duke's Men of Yale (a cappella singing group)
 Steiner Brothers, tap-dancing trio and singing group

Albums released
Anthology of American Folk Music – Various Artists
As You Desire Me – Jo Stafford
Billie Holiday Sings – Billie Holiday
Bird and Diz – Charlie Parker and Dizzy Gillespie
Christmas Day in the Morning – Burl Ives
Christmas with Eddie Fisher – Eddie Fisher
Eddie Fisher Sings – Eddie Fisher
Favorite Spirituals – Ames Brothers
Harmony Encores – The Chordettes
Home on the Range – Ames Brothers
Johnnie Ray – Johnnie Ray
I'm in the Mood for Love – Eddie Fisher
Mr. Rhythm Sings – Frankie Laine
Oscar Peterson Plays Duke Ellington – Oscar Peterson
Penthouse Serenade – Nat King Cole
Song Favorites By Frankie Laine – Frankie Laine
Tennessee Waltz – Patti Page

US No. 1 hit singles
These singles reached the top of US Billboard magazine's charts in 1952.

Biggest hit singles
The following singles achieved the highest chart positions in the limited set of charts available for 1952.

Top hits on record

Published popular music
 "Blue Tango"   words: Mitchell Parish, music: Leroy Anderson
 "Comes A-Long A-Love"   w.m. Al Sherman
 "Delicado"   w. Jack Lawrence m. Waldyr Azevedo
 "(How Much Is) That Doggie in the Window?"   w.m. Bob Merrill
 "Don't Laugh at Me ('Cause I'm a Fool)"   w.m. Norman Wisdom & June Tremayne
 "Don't Let The Stars Get In Your Eyes"   w.m. Barbara Trammel, Cactus Pryor & Slim Whitman
 "Faith Can Move Mountains"   w. Ben Raleigh m. Guy Wood
 "Feet Up"   w.m. Bob Merrill
 "A Fool Such As I"   w.m. Bill Trader
 "Gonna Get Along Without Ya Now"   w.m. Milton Kellem
 "A Guy Is A Guy"   w.m. Oscar Brand
 "(Mama) He Treats Your Daughter Mean"   w.m. Charles Singleton & J. H. Wallace
 "Here in My Heart"   w.m. Pat Genaro, Lou Levinson & Bill Borrelli
 "High Noon"   w. Ned Washington m. Dimitri Tiomkin
 "Hi-Lili, Hi-Lo"   w. Helen Deutsch m. Bronislau Kaper
 "Hold Me, Thrill Me, Kiss Me"   w.m. Harry Noble
 "Hound Dog"   w.m. Jerry Leiber & Mike Stoller
 "I Know a Place" w. Sammy Cahn m. Vernon Duke Introduced by Doris Day & Ray Bolger in the film April in Paris
 "I Saw Mommy Kissing Santa Claus"   w.m. Tommie Connor
 "I Went To Your Wedding"   w.m. Jessie Mae Robinson
 "I'll Never Get Out Of This World Alive"   w.m. Hank Williams & Fred Rose
 "I'm Hans Christian Andersen"   w.m. Frank Loesser
 "Inchworm"   w.m. Frank Loesser
 "It Wasn't God Who Made Honky Tonk Angels"   w.m. J. D. Miller
 "It's In The Book"   w.m. Johnny Standley & Art Thorsen
 "Jambalaya"   w.m. Hank Williams
 "Kaw-Liga"   w.m. Hank Williams & Fred Rose
 "Keep It A Secret"   w.m. Jessie Mae Robinson
 "The King's New Clothes"   w.m. Frank Loesser
 "Lawdy Miss Clawdy"   w.m. Lloyd Price
 "Lean Baby"   w. Roy Alfred m. Billy May
 "Lullaby of Birdland"   w. B. Y. Forster (pseudonym for George David Weiss) m. George Shearing
 "Luna Rossa"   w. (Eng) Kermit Goell (Ital) V. de Crescenzo m. A. Vian
 "Mister Taptoe"   w.m. Terry Gilkyson, Richard Dehr & Frank Miller
 "Never Smile at a Crocodile"   F. Churchill, J. Lawrence
 "Oh Happy Day"   w.m. Donald Howard Koplow & Nancy Binns Reed
 "The Ol' Spring Fever" w. Leo Robin m. Harry Warren from the film Just For You
 "One Mint Julep"   w.m. Rudy Toombs
 "Outside of Heaven" w. Sammy Gallop m. Chester Conn
 "Petite Fleur"   m. Sidney Bechet
 "Pittsburgh, Pennsylvania"   w.m. Bob Merrill
 "Pretend"   w.m. Lew Douglas, Cliff Parman & Frank Levere
 "Pretty Little Black-Eyed Susie"   Kay Twomey, Fred Wise & Ben Weisman
 "Raminay (The New Orleans Chimney Sweep)" w.m. J. Lawrence, Sammy Fain
 "She Wears Red Feathers"   w.m. Bob Merrill
 "Sugar Bush"   w.m. Josef Marais
 "Take These Chains from My Heart"   w.m. Fred Rose & Hy Heath
 "Takes Two to Tango"   w.m. Al Hoffman & Dick Manning
 "That's All"   w. Alan Brandt m. Bob Haymes
 "That's Entertainment!"   w. Howard Dietz m. Arthur Schwartz
 "Till I Waltz Again With You"   w.m. Sidney Prosen
 "The Ugly Duckling"   w.m. Frank Loesser
 "To Know You (Is to Love You)"   w. Allan Roberts m. Robert Allen
 "Walkin' To Missouri"   w.m. Bob Merrill
 "Wheel Of Fortune"   w.m. Bennie Benjamin & George David Weiss
 "When I Fall in Love"   w. Edward Heyman m. Victor Young
 "Why Don't You Believe Me?"   w.m. Lew Douglas, King Laney & Roy Rodde
 "Wish You Were Here"   w.m. Harold Rome
 "You Belong to Me"   w.m. Pee Wee King, Redd Stewart & Chilton Price
 "Your Cheatin' Heart"   w.m. Hank Williams
 "Zing A Little Zong"   w. Leo Robin m. Harry Warren

Top R&B and country hits on record
"5-10-15 Hours" – Ruth Brown
"Daddy Daddy" – Ruth Brown
"Hound Dog" – Big Mama Thornton
"Jambalaya (On the Bayou)" – Hank Williams
"Juke" – Little Walter
"Lawdy Miss Clawdy" – Lloyd Price
"Midnight Special" – The Weavers
"Night Train" – Jimmy Forrest
"Wimoweh" – The Weavers
"Worry, Worry, Worry" – Joe Houston
"It Wasn't God Who Made Honky Tonk Angels" – Kitty Wells

Classical music

Premieres

1 The ensemble Bruno Maderna conducted comprised both faculty and students of the Ferienkurse and members of the Landestheater Orchestra Darmstadt.
2 Only the first half of Spiel was performed at Donaueschingen in 1952. The complete score was only first performed in a radio recording made in July 1973 with the SWR Symphony Orchestra, Baden-Baden, conducted by the composer. The first public performance of the complete composition was given by the Berlin Philharmonic on 14 September 1975, also under the composer's baton.

Compositions
Jean Barraqué
Piano Sonata
Benjamin Britten – Canticle II: Abraham and Isaac, Op. 51
John Cage
4′33″
Carlos Chávez
Sinfonía romántica (Symphony No. 4)
George Crumb
String Trio
Three Pastoral Pieces
Luigi Dallapiccola
Quaderno musicale di Annalibera, solo piano
Alberto Ginastera
Piano Sonata No. 1
Carlos Guastavino
Suite argentina, ballet
Dmitry Kabalevsky
Piano Concerto No. 3
Wojciech Kilar
Conjured for baritone and seven instruments
Quintet for woodwind instruments
Suite No. 2 for piano
Sonata No. 1 for piano
Erich Wolfgang Korngold
Symphony
Otto Luening
Fantasy in Space for flute and tape
Invention in Twelve Notes for flute and tape
Low Speed for flute and tape
Frank Martin
Harpsichord Concerto
Bohuslav Martinů
Rhapsody-Concerto for Viola and Orchestra
Olivier Messiaen
Le Merle noir
Wilhelm Peterson-Berger
Canzone for Violin and Piano
Prokofiev, Sergei
Symphony No. 7
Joaquín Rodrigo
Concierto Serenata for Harp and Orchestra
Edmund Rubbra
Viola Concerto
Dmitri Shostakovich
String Quartet No. 5
Karlheinz Stockhausen
Klavierstücke I–IV
Punkte [withdrawn, revised in 1962]
Schlagquartett
Spiel
Igor Stravinsky
Cantata
Vaughan Williams, Ralph
Sinfonia antartica (Symphony No. 7)
Heitor Villa-Lobos
 Piano Concerto No. 4
 Symphony No. 9

Opera
Franco Alfano – Sakùntala (revision of his 1921 opera La leggenda di Sakùntala)
Leonard Bernstein – Trouble in Tahiti
Raymond Chevreuille – Atta Troll
Mozart Camargo Guarnieri – Pedro Malazarte (comic opera in one act, libretto by Mario de Andrade, premiered in May at the Theatro Municipal in Rio de Janeiro)

Jazz

Musical theatre
 Bet Your Life London production opened at the Hippodrome on February 18 and ran for 362 performances
 Curtain Going Up Broadway production
 The Globe Revue London revue opened on July 10 at the Globe Theatre
 Love from Judy London production opened at the Saville Theatre on September 25 and ran for 594 performances
 New Faces of 1952 Broadway production
 Pal Joey (Richard Rodgers and Lorenz Hart) – Broadway revival of original 1940 production
 Ring Out the Bells London revue opened at the Victoria Palace Theatre on November 12
 Three Wishes for Jamie Broadway production opened at the Mark Hellinger Theatre on March 21 and moved to the Plymouth Theatre on May 27 for a total run of 92 performances
 Two's Company Broadway production
 Wish You Were Here Broadway production

Musical films

 Aaron Slick from Punkin Crick starring Alan Young, Dinah Shore, Robert Merrill and Adele Jergens. Directed by Claude Binyon.
Affair in Trinidad starring Rita Hayworth and Glenn Ford
 April in Paris starring Doris Day and Ray Bolger
Because You're Mine starring Mario Lanza and Doretta Morrow
 Bloodhounds of Broadway starring Mitzi Gaynor, Scott Brady and Mitzi Green
 Everything I Have Is Yours starring Marge Champion, Gower Champion and Monica Lewis
 Hans Christian Andersen starring Danny Kaye and Jane Wyman
 Just for You starring Bing Crosby and Jane Wyman
 The Las Vegas Story starring Jane Russell, Victor Mature and Hoagy Carmichael
 Lovely to Look At starring Kathryn Grayson, Red Skelton, Howard Keel, Marge Champion, Gower Champion and Ann Miller
 Meet Danny Wilson starring Frank Sinatra and Shelley Winters
 The Merry Widow starring Lana Turner, Fernando Lamas and Una Merkel
 Road to Bali starring Bing Crosby, Bob Hope and Dorothy Lamour
 She's Working Her Way Through College starring Virginia Mayo and Ronald Reagan
 Sing Along with Me starring Donald Peers, Dodo Watts & Dennis Vance directed  by Peter Graham Scott
 Singin' in the Rain starring Gene Kelly, Donald O'Connor and Debbie Reynolds
 Skirts Ahoy! starring Esther Williams, Joan Evans, Vivian Blaine and Keefe Brasselle, and featuring Billy Eckstine, The DeMarco Sisters, Debbie Reynolds and Bobby Van.
 Son of Paleface starring Bob Hope, Jane Russell, Roy Rogers and Trigger
 Where's Charley? starring Ray Bolger and Allyn Ann McLerie
 With a Song in My Heart starring Susan Hayward and Rory Calhoun

Births
January 2 – Graeme Strachan, Australian singer-songwriter (died 2001)
January 10 – Scott Thurston, American guitarist and songwriter
January 15 
 Boris Blank, Swiss musician
 Melvyn Gale, cellist (Electric Light Orchestra)
 Skay Beilinson, Argentinian guitar player 
January 17 – Ryuichi Sakamoto, Japanese musician and composer
January 20 – Paul Stanley, rock guitarist and singer (Kiss)
January 21 – Cyril and Libbye Hellier, American operatic sopranos
January 22 – Teddy Gentry (Alabama (band))
January 25 – Timothy White, American rock journalist (died 2002)
January 29 – Tommy Ramone (The Ramones)
January 30 – Steve Bartek (Oingo Boingo)
February 1 – Jenő Jandó (Hungarian pianist)
February 4 – Jerry Shirley (band Humble Pie)
February 12 – Michael McDonald (The Doobie Brothers)
February 16 – James Ingram, American R&B singer, songwriter and producer (died 2019)
February 13 – Edward John Gagliardi (Foreigner)
February 18 – Juice Newton, pop and country singer, songwriter and guitarist
February 20
Halvor Haug, Norwegian composer
Matti Rantanen, Finnish accordionist
February 21 – Jean-Jacques Burnel (The Stranglers)
February 23 – Brad Whitford (Aerosmith)
March 11 – Vince Giordano, bass saxophonist and band leader for the Nighthawks Orchestra
March 13 – Wolfgang Rihm, composer
March 15 – Howard Devoto, punk rock singer-songwriter (Buzzcocks, Magazine, Luxuria, ShelleyDevoto)
March 22 – Jay Dee Daugherty (Patti Smith Group)
April 2 – Leon Wilkeson (Lynyrd Skynyrd)
April 4 – Gary Moore, blues guitarist and singer (died 2011)
April 13 – Rosa Passos, Brazilian Bossa Nova singer
April 17 – Jerry Knight, vocalist, bassist, songwriter and producer (died 1996)
May 11 – Renaud, composer
May 14 – David Byrne, singer-songwriter (Talking Heads)
May 18 – George Strait, country singer, actor and music producer
May 19 – Barbara Joyce Lomas (B. T. Express)
May 23 – Dillie Keane, cabaret performer
May 30 – Zoltan Kocsis, composer and pianist (died 2016)
June 5 – Nicko McBrain (Iron Maiden, Trust, etc.)
June 7 – Royce Campbell, American guitarist, composer and producer
June 11 – Donnie Van Zant rock guitarist and vocalist (38 Special)
June 12
Junior Brown, country guitarist and singer
Oliver Knussen, composer (died 2018)
June 16 – Gino Vannelli, Canadian singer, songwriter, musician and composer
June 19 – Jim Johnston, American composer and musician
June 25 – Tim Finn, New Zealand singer-songwriter
July 1
Dan Aykroyd, actor (The Blues Brothers)
Timothy J. Tobias, American pianist and composer (died 2006)
July 2 – Johnny Colla (Huey Lewis and the News)
July 3 – Laura Branigan, American singer (Gloria) and actress (died 2004)
July 4 - John Waite, English musician
July 12 – Philip Taylor Kramer, American bass player (Iron Butterfly) (died 1995)
July 14 – Bob Casale, American guitarist, keyboard player and producer (Devo) (died 2014)
July 15 – David Pack, frontman, vocalist and guitarist with rock group Ambrosia
July 16 – Stewart Copeland, drummer (The Police)
July 17
Nicolette Larson, singer (died 1997)
Phoebe Snow, singer-songwriter (died 2011)
July 19 – Allen Collins, American guitarist and songwriter (Lynyrd Skynyrd, Rossington Collins Band and Allen Collins Band) (died 1990)
July 22
John Rutsey, Canadian drummer (Rush) (died 2008)
Janis Siegel, American singer (The Manhattan Transfer)
July 28 – Glenn A. Baker, Australian music journalist
July 31 – Reinhard Goebel, German early music conductor and violinist
August 4 – Moya Brennan, Irish folk harpist and singer (Clannad)
August 6 – Pat MacDonald, American new wave musician (Timbuk 3)
August 16 – Gianna Rolandi, American soprano (died 2021)
August 20 – John Hiatt, guitarist, pianist and singer
August 21 – Joe Strummer, singer and songwriter (The Clash) (died 2002)
August 26 – Billy Rush, Asbury Jukes
August 27 – Laurie Wisefield, guitarist for Wishbone Ash
September 4 – Martin Chambers, The Pretenders
September 9 – Dave Stewart, English musician, songwriter and record producer, Eurythmics
September 12
Gerry Beckley, rock singer-songwriter (America)
Neil Peart, rock drummer & songwriter (Rush) (died 2020)
September 13 – Randy Jones, singer (Village People)
September 18 – Dee Dee Ramone, bassist (The Ramones) (died 2002)
September 19 – Nile Rodgers, American record producer, songwriter, musician, composer, arranger and guitarist (The Honeydrippers, Chic)
September 22 – Oliver Mtukudzi ("Tuku"), Zimbabwean Afro jazz singer-guitarist (died 2019)
September 30 – John Lombardo, American musician (10,000 Maniacs, John & Mary)
October 21 – Miroslav Žbirka, Slovak singer-songwriter
November 2
Maxine Nightingale, singer
Alan Winstanley, producer
November 11 – Paul Cowsill (The Cowsills)
November 14 – Johnny A., guitarist and songwriter
November 18 - John Parr, English musician and singer-songwriter
November 20 – Semyon Bychkov, conductor
November 27 – Bappi Lahiri, Indian film composer
December 3 – Don Barnes (38 Special)
December 23 – Hans Abrahamsen, Danish composer
December 27 – David Knopfler (Dire Straits)

Deaths
January 9 – Midge Williams, singer
January 14 – Artur Kapp, Estonian composer (d. 1878)
January 16 – René Voisin, trumpeter
January 20 – Arthur Farwell, composer and conductor
February 13 – Alfred Einstein, musicologist
March 17 – Percy Wenrich, ragtime composer
March 22 – Uncle Dave Macon, musician
April 19 – Steve Conway, British singer (born 1920)
April 23 – Elisabeth Schumann, operatic soprano
May 23 – Georg Schumann, German composer (born 1866)
May 15 – Italo Montemezzi, composer
June 9 – Adolf Busch, violinist and composer
June 13 – Emma Eames, operatic soprano
June 14 – John Kirby, jazz musician
June 25 – Luke Jordan, blues musician
July 2 – Henriëtte Hilda Bosmans, Dutch composer and pianist (born 1895)
July 10 – Rued Langgaard, Danish composer and organist (born 1893)
September 6 – Gertrude Lawrence, English actress, singer, dancer
September 16 – Vesta Tilley, music hall entertainer
September 18 – Frances Alda, operatic soprano
September 19 – Nat Ayer, composer
October 25 – Sergei Bortkiewicz, pianist and composer
October 26 – Hattie McDaniel
November 1 – Dixie Lee, singer, dancer and actress, wife of Bing Crosby
November 4 – Max Adler, violinist
November 17 – Charles Penrose, music hall performer
December 25 – Bernardino Molinari, arranger and conductor (born 1880)
December 26 – Paul Breisach, conductor
December 28 – Fletcher Henderson, jazz musician
December 30
Willie Brown, blues musician
Nakayama Shimpei, songwriter
date unknown
Tryphosa Bates-Batcheller, singer
Georgette Harvey, actress and singer

References

Sources
 

 
20th century in music
Music by year